Carl-Uwe Steeb (born 1 September 1967) is a former professional tennis player from Germany.

Steeb turned professional in 1986. He won his first top-level singles title in 1989 in Gstaad. His best singles performances at Grand Slam events came in reaching the fourth round at the Australian Open in 1988, the US Open in 1991, and the French Open in 1992.

Steeb was a member of three German Davis Cup champion teams – in 1988, 1989 and 1993 (he played in the final in '88 and '89, and in the earlier rounds in '93).

Over the course of his career, Steeb won three top-level singles titles and three tour doubles titles. His career-high rankings were World No. 14 in singles (in 1990), and World No. 41 in doubles (in 1989). His career prize money totalled $2,320,082. Steeb retired from the professional tour in 1996.

Career finals

Singles (3 wins, 5 losses)

Doubles (3 wins, 2 losses)

External links 
 
 
 

1967 births
Living people
People from Aalen
Sportspeople from Stuttgart (region)
German male tennis players
Hopman Cup competitors
Olympic tennis players of Germany
Olympic tennis players of West Germany
Tennis players at the 1988 Summer Olympics
Tennis players at the 1992 Summer Olympics
West German male tennis players
Tennis people from Baden-Württemberg